The Garden house at Charlton House, in the Royal Borough of Greenwich, is a summer house dating from the 1630s. The structure is often attributed to Inigo Jones, though there is no documentary evidence to support this claim. Its original purpose is unknown. In the 20th century, the building functioned as a public lavatory and by the 21st had become derelict and was placed on Historic England's Heritage at Risk Register. As of 2022, the garden house is undergoing restoration. It is a Grade I listed building.

History
Charlton House was built between 1607–1612  for Sir Adam Newton, Dean of Durham and tutor to Prince Henry, eldest son of James I. Bridget Cherry and Nikolaus Pevsner, in their 2002 revised edition, London 2: South, of the Pevsner Buildings of England date the garden house as slightly later, c.1630. The exact purpose of the building is uncertain; it has been described as a garden house, a pavilion, a banqueting house, a drinking house, an orangery, an armoury and a summer house. Its architect is also unknown but Cherry and Pevsner consider the traditional attribution to Inigo Jones as "quite justifiable". Jones, the pre-eminent architect of the Jacobean era, was appointed Surveyor-General of the King's Works in 1615 and undertook a great deal of work for James I and then for his son Charles, including the Queen's House, at Greenwich, a short distance along the River Thames from Charlton House. Cherry also finds support for the Jonesian attribution for the “handsome” summerhouse on stylistic grounds, noting the Tuscan pilasters and the "complete absence of Jacobean frills at such an early date".

Between the First and the Second World Wars, the garden house was converted into a public lavatory. These facilities closed in the early 1990s and by the 21st century the garden house was derelict and placed on Historic England's Heritage at Risk Register. As of 2022, the garden house is undergoing restoration.

Architecture and description
The Garden house is constructed of red brick, and comprises a single storey set on a basement. It has a high roof in a pyramidal style. It is a Grade I listed building.

Notes

References

Sources

External links

Charlton, London
Grade I listed buildings in the Royal Borough of Greenwich
Buildings and structures in the Royal Borough of Greenwich